"Caroline" is a song from American alternative rock band Concrete Blonde, which was released in 1990 as the third single from their third studio album Bloodletting. The song was written by Johnette Napolitano, and produced by Concrete Blonde and Chris Tsangarides. The song reached number 23 on the US Billboard Modern Rock Tracks chart.

Music video
The song's music video was directed by Rupert Nadeau and produced by Liz Wartenberg. It achieved medium rotation on MTV.

Critical reception
Mike Boehm, writing for the Los Angeles Times, described "Caroline" as "a mysterious, gorgeously evocative song that recalls Fleetwood Mac's 'Rhiannon'." In a review of Bloodletting, Marc D. Allan of The Indianapolis Star wrote, "'Caroline' is a good example of the band's strengths. Napolitano's lush vocals, combined with Mankey's eerie guitar, create a subtle but powerful piece of pop." In a retrospective review, Ned Raggett of AllMusic described the song's lyrics as "addressing a departed friend".

Formats

Personnel
Credits are adapted from the US and European CD single liner notes and the Bloodletting CD album booklet.Caroline Johnette Napolitano – vocals, bass
 James Mankey – guitars
 Paul Thompson – drumsProduction'
 Concrete Blonde – producers ("Caroline", "Days and Days", "Little Wing")
 Chris Tsangarides – producer ("Caroline", "Days and Days")
 Earle Mankey, James Mankey – additional recording and mixing ("Caroline", "Days and Days")
 Chris Marshall – production assistance ("Caroline", "Days and Days")
 Rob Bingston – recording and mixing (live tracks only)
 John Golden – mastering

Charts

References

1990 songs
1990 singles
Concrete Blonde songs
Songs written by Johnette Napolitano
I.R.S. Records singles